Shahrood or Shah-Rud (literally meaning The great river or the river of the king), also translated as Shah River, is a river of northern Iran.

Course
The Shahrood originates on the slopes of the Takht-e Suleyman Massif at 4850 m.. 
The Taliqan and Alamut rivers conjoin to form the Shahrood river. The Alamut river, the northern tributary, starts near the summit of Alam-Kuh, the second highest peak in Iran, and flows through a steep gorges. 
The Shahrood then flows westward through the southern Alborz mountain range to its confluence with the Sefid River. It is a right-hand tributary of the Sefid River, which then flows north through the Alborz into the Caspian Sea.

Central Alborz mountain range map
The Shahrood is #12 on the map's left.

See also

References

External links
 Flickr.com: Shah River photo

Rivers of Mazandaran Province
Alborz (mountain range)
Tributaries of the Sefīd-Rūd